Carabus ajax is a species of ground beetle in the Carabinae subfamily that is endemic to Sichuan, China.

References

ajax
Beetles described in 1933
Beetles of Asia
Endemic fauna of Sichuan